Song Tae-Lim  (Hanja: 宋泰林; born 20 February 1984) is a South Korean football defender, who currently plays for Shenyang Dongjin in China League One.

Club career statistics 
Last update: 28 April 2010

Interntiaonl goals

Henan Jianye

External links 

1984 births
Living people
South Korean footballers
South Korean expatriate footballers
Jeonnam Dragons players
Busan IPark players
Henan Songshan Longmen F.C. players
Goyang KB Kookmin Bank FC players
Shenyang Dongjin players
Chinese Super League players
China League One players
K League 1 players
Korea National League players
Expatriate footballers in China
South Korean expatriate sportspeople in China
Chung-Ang University alumni
Association football midfielders
People from Geoje
Sportspeople from South Gyeongsang Province